Terry William Rozier III (born March 17, 1994) is an American professional basketball player for the Charlotte Hornets of the National Basketball Association (NBA). He played college basketball for the Louisville Cardinals before being selected with the 16th overall pick in the 2015 NBA draft by the Boston Celtics. Rozier spent his first 4 seasons as a reserve with the Celtics until being traded to the Hornets in a sign-and-trade deal.

Early life
Rozier was born in Youngstown, Ohio, in 1994. His father, Terry Rozier Sr., was sent to prison for eight years two months after his birth. Then, in 2005, Rozier Jr. spent a few months with his father, who had just been released from prison, before he was arrested again on charges of involuntary manslaughter for his involvement in a robbery and kidnapping from 2003 that had led to the accidental death of an accomplice. Rozier Sr. was then sentenced to thirteen years in prison. As a consequence, Rozier was raised primarily by his mother, Gina Tucker, and his grandmother, Amanda Tucker, alongside his brother and half sister.

High school career
Rozier starred at Shaker Heights High School in Shaker Heights, Ohio, graduating in 2012. In his senior year, he averaged 25.6 points, 6.5 rebounds, 4.5 assists and 4.7 steals per game while leading Shaker to a 21–3 record and taking them to the regional semifinals as a senior for the first time since 2002. He was named an All-Lake Erie League selection for three years and was 74th in recruiting ranking on ESPNU's Top 100 Players list in 2012.

As he needed to improve his grades, Rozier initially played at Hargrave Military Academy before joining Louisville. In his 2012–13 campaign at Hargrave, Rozier averaged 29.3 points, 7.8 rebounds, and 5.6 assists while the team went 38–8; he also earned the 2012 Kentucky Derby Festival Basketball Classic MVP and placed second in the dunk and three-point contest that season.

College career
As a freshman at Louisville in 2013–14, Rozier averaged 7.0 points and 3.1 rebounds per game in 37 games, and made the ACC All-Rookie Team. As a sophomore in 2014–15, Rozier led the Cardinals in scoring with 17.1 points per game, and was named second-team All-ACC. On March 30, 2015, Rozier and Louisville teammate Montrezl Harrell declared for the 2015 NBA draft.

Professional career

Boston Celtics (2015–2019)
On June 25, 2015, Rozier was selected by the Boston Celtics with the 16th overall pick in the 2015 NBA draft. On July 27, 2015, he signed his rookie scale contract with the Celtics. During his rookie season, he received multiple assignments to the Maine Red Claws, Boston's D-League affiliate. He appeared in 39 regular season games for the Celtics in 2015–16, scoring a season-high seven points twice. In his first playoff game, he scored 10 points on 4-of-7 shooting against the Atlanta Hawks.
On November 12, 2016, Rozier scored a career-high 11 points in a 105–99 win over the Indiana Pacers. He topped that mark nine days later, scoring 12 points in a 99–93 win over the Minnesota Timberwolves. On December 7, he scored a career-high 16 points in a 117–87 win over the Orlando Magic. On March 19, 2017, he recorded his first career double-double with 14 points and 10 rebounds in a 105–99 loss to the Philadelphia 76ers.

On November 24, 2017, Rozier had a career-high 23 points in a 118–103 win over the Orlando Magic. On December 18, he made a steal and go-ahead dunk with 1.5 seconds remaining that gave the Celtics a 112–111 victory over the Indiana Pacers. On January 31, Rozier logged his first career triple-double in his first NBA start to help the Celtics to a 103–73 victory over the New York Knicks. He recorded 17 points, 11 rebounds and 10 assists to become just the second player in NBA history with a triple-double in his first start, joining Tony Wroten, who set the initial record on November 13, 2013, with the Philadelphia 76ers. Two days later, in his second career start, Rozier scored a career-high 31 points in a 119–110 win over the Hawks. On March 25, in his sixth start in place of the injured Kyrie Irving, Rozier scored a career-high 33 points in a 104–93 win over the Sacramento Kings. He also had five rebounds and three assists. In Game 2 of the Celtics' first-round playoff series against the Milwaukee Bucks, Rozier scored 23 points in helping Boston take a 2–0 series lead with a 120–106 win. In Game 7, Rozier scored 26 points in a 112–96 win over the Bucks. In Game 1 of their second-round series against the 76ers, Rozier recorded 29 points, eight rebounds and six assists in a 117–101 win. In Game 6 of the Eastern Conference Finals, Rozier scored 28 points in a 109–99 loss to the Cleveland Cavaliers. The Celtics lost in seven games to Cleveland.

On November 9, Rozier scored a then season-high 22 points in a 123–115 loss to the Utah Jazz, making his first start of the season in place of Irving. On January 30, he had 17 points and tied a career high with 10 assists in a 126–94 win over the Charlotte Hornets.

Charlotte Hornets (2019–present)
On July 6, 2019, Rozier was traded to the Charlotte Hornets, as part of a sign-and-trade deal involving Kemba Walker. The contract was for three years and $56.7 million. On December 18, 2019, he scored a then career-high 35 points in a 100–98 loss to the Cleveland Cavaliers. He would surpass that on March 8, 2020, scoring 40 points in a 143–138 double overtime loss to the Atlanta Hawks.

On December 23, 2020, Rozier put up a then-career-high 42 points, along with three rebounds, two assists, two steals, and one block, in a 121–114 loss to the Cleveland Cavaliers. He surpassed this mark with a new career-high 43 points in a 112-110 loss to the New Orleans Pelicans on May 9, 2021.

In September 2021, Rozier signed a four-year extension with Charlotte through 2025-26 with a total value of $97 million.

Career statistics

NBA

Regular season

|-
| style="text-align:left;"| 
| style="text-align:left;"| Boston
| 39 || 0 || 8.0 || .274 || .222 || .800 || 1.6 || .9 || .2 || .0 || 1.8
|-
| style="text-align:left;"| 
| style="text-align:left;"| Boston
| 74 || 0 || 17.1 || .367 || .318 || .773 || 3.1 || 1.8 || .6 || .1 || 5.5
|-
| style="text-align:left;"| 
| style="text-align:left;"| Boston
| 80 || 16 || 25.9 || .395 || .381 || .772 || 4.7 || 2.9 || 1.0 || .2 || 11.3
|-
| style="text-align:left;"| 
| style="text-align:left;"| Boston
| 79 || 14 || 22.7 || .387 || .353 || .785 || 3.9 || 2.9 || .9 || .3 || 9.0
|-
| style="text-align:left;"| 
| style="text-align:left;"| Charlotte
| 63 || 63 || 34.3 || .423 || .407 || .874 || 4.4 || 4.1 || 1.0 || .2 || 18.0
|-
| style="text-align:left;"| 
| style="text-align:left;"| Charlotte
| 69 || 69 || 34.5 || .450 || .389 || .817 || 4.4 || 4.2 || 1.3 || .4 || 20.4
|-
| style="text-align:left;"| 
| style="text-align:left;"| Charlotte
| 73 || 73 || 33.7 || .444 || .374 || .852 || 4.3 || 4.5 || 1.3 || .3 || 19.3
|- class="sortbottom"
| style="text-align:center;" colspan="2"| Career
| 477 || 235 || 26.1 || .417 || .376 || .822 || 3.9 || 3.2 || .9 || .2 || 12.7

Playoffs

|-
| style="text-align:left;"| 2016
| style="text-align:left;"| Boston
| 5 || 0 || 19.8 || .391 || .364 || 1.000 || 3.4 || 1.2 || .2 || .6 || 4.8
|-
| style="text-align:left;"| 2017
| style="text-align:left;"| Boston
| 17 || 0 || 16.3 || .402 || .368 || .800 || 2.6 || 1.9 || .6 || .2 || 5.6
|-
| style="text-align:left;"| 2018
| style="text-align:left;"| Boston
| 19 || 19 || 36.6 || .406 || .347 || .821 || 5.3 || 5.7 || 1.3 || .3 || 16.5
|-
| style="text-align:left;"| 2019
| style="text-align:left;"| Boston
| 9 || 0 || 18.0 || .322 || .235 || .750 || 4.3 || 1.9 || .4 || .2 || 6.4
|- class="sortbottom"
| style="text-align:center;" colspan="2"| Career
| 50 || 19 || 24.7 || .393 || .335 || .809 || 4.0 || 3.3 || .8 || .3 || 9.8

College

|-
| style="text-align:left;"| 2013–14
| style="text-align:left;"| Louisville
| 37 || 10 || 18.9 || .401 || .371 || .712 || 3.1 || 1.8 || 1.0 || .1 || 7.0
|-
| style="text-align:left;"| 2014–15
| style="text-align:left;"| Louisville
| 36 || 35 || 35.0 || .411 || .306 || .790 || 5.6 || 3.0 || 2.0 || .2 || 17.1
|- class="sortbottom"
| style="text-align:center;" colspan="2"| Career
| 73 || 45 || 26.8 || .408 || .331 || .772 || 4.3 || 2.4 || 1.5 || .1 || 12.0

References

External links

Louisville Cardinals bio

1994 births
Living people
American men's basketball players
Basketball players from Youngstown, Ohio
Boston Celtics draft picks
Boston Celtics players
Charlotte Hornets players
Louisville Cardinals men's basketball players
Maine Red Claws players
Point guards
Shooting guards
Sportspeople from Shaker Heights, Ohio